Rabiu Ali (born 27 September 1980) is a Nigerian football midfielder who plays for Kano Pillars F.C. He is the current captain of Kano Pillars F.C. and is regarded as one of the club's greatest ever players and one of the best players in Nigerian Professional Football League.

Prior to joining kano Pillars, he played for Total Pillars (Red Devils) from 2005 to 2011

International career

International goals
Scores and results list Nigeria's goal tally first.

Honours 
Kano Pillars
Winner
 Nigeria Premier League (3): 2011–12, 2012–13, 2013–14
Nigeria FA Cup(1)
Champion: 2019
Runner up: 2018

References

External links 
 

1980 births
Living people
Nigerian footballers
Nigeria international footballers
Kano Pillars F.C. players
Association football midfielders
Sportspeople from Kaduna
Nigeria A' international footballers
2014 African Nations Championship players
2018 African Nations Championship players